Truckee station is an Amtrak train station in Truckee, California.

It is currently served by one daily passenger train in each direction, the California Zephyr. The westbound train arrives in the morning from Chicago and Denver heading for Sacramento and Emeryville with the eastbound train calling in mid-afternoon.

History
The Central Pacific Railroad selected Truckee as the name of its railroad station by August 1867, even though the tracks would not reach the station until a year later in 1868.

In FY2012 Truckee was the 61st-busiest of the 74 Amtrak stations in California, boarding or detraining an average of about 26 passengers daily.

Bus service
The station is served by daily Greyhound buses, and local Tahoe Truckee Area Regional Transit (TART).

Platforms and tracks

References

External links

Truckee Amtrak Station (USA RailGuide – TrainWeb)

Railway stations in Nevada County, California
Railway stations in the United States opened in 1891
Former Southern Pacific Railroad stations in California
Amtrak stations in California